Mohamed Anwar Esmat Sadat (محمد أنور عصمت السادات; born 1955) is an Egyptian politician. He was a member of the Egyptian Parliament during the rule of Hosni Mubarak. He is related to two prominent Egyptian politicians, as the nephew of Anwar Sadat and brother of Talaat Sadat. He won a seat during the 2011–12 Egyptian parliamentary election for the second constituency (Fardi) Monufia Governorate and is the founder of the Reform and Development Party along with Raymond Lakah.

He participated actively in Egyptian politics, and in 2005 he was elected to the Egyptian People's Assembly (Parliament) where he was a member of the Foreign Relations Committee and the People's Assembly Economic Committee. He was also an active member of the Egyptian Council for Foreign Affairs (ECFA). He participated in several international political, economic and social organizations, conferences and workshops in Egypt, the Arab world and Europe. He wrote for several Egyptian newspapers with private and political interests on development issues in Egypt. He was involved in the establishment of the Sadat Organization for Development and Social Care, and serves currently as its president. In 2006, Al-Sadat submitted a motion in parliament and demanded an investigation into the activities of the Mubarak aide and Member of Parliament Zakaria Azmi for corruption allegations. Azmi was sentenced to jail in May 2012.

In 2007, he was kicked out of Parliament after declaring bankruptcy. On 27 February 2017, he was kicked out of the parliament again after criticizing Egypt's human rights record. He allegedly “belittled” the Egyptian parliament in correspondence with foreign associations and was accused of falsifying lawmakers' signatures on a draft bill. He intended to run in the 2018 Egyptian Presidential Election but later withdrew saying that the conditions were not democratic enough for him to run. He could not find a hotel to launch his campaign.

References

1955 births
Living people
Candidates for President of Egypt
Sadat family
Members of the House of Representatives (Egypt)
Members of the Egyptian Constituent Assembly of 2012
People from Monufia Governorate
21st-century Egyptian politicians
Egyptian political party founders